Lance Patrick is an American-born stand up comedian, who made his television debut in 2014, on season three of Comedy Central's Gabriel Iglesias Presents Stand Up Revolution. He was born in Elkhart, Indiana.

References

Links

The Daily Telegraph "Thrown in the deep end but now he can joke" Chris Hook (March 20, 2015)
Scenestr "Lance Patrick Brings A Stand-Up Revolution To Australia" Peter Thrupp (March 16, 2015)
 Comedy Central Press Release (September 15, 2014)
South Bend Tribune "Elkhart native opens for Iglesias"  Jeff Harrell (October 24, 2013)
The Elkhart Truth "Elkhart-born comedian opening for stand-up star Gabriel Iglesias in South Bend" Angelle Barbazon (October 23, 2013)
Leader Publication "Michiana comedian to visit Morris Performing Arts Center" Ambrosia Neldon (October 16, 2013)
Florida Times Union "Comedian with Northeast Florida ties opening for Gabriel Iglesias" David Crumpler (March 22, 2013)

American stand-up comedians
People from Elkhart, Indiana
Living people
Year of birth missing (living people)
Comedians from Indiana